Optus Sport is an Australian group of sports channels, owned by Optus launched on 13 July 2016.

The channels are available through Optus' Yes TV by Fetch IPTV platform, or through an Optus Decoder on the VAST Satellite Network, as well as through companion apps and the Optus Sport website.

The network was launched after Optus outbid the incumbent Foxtel for the English Premier League television rights, and the 24/7 channel Optus Sport 1 rebroadcasts the IMG world feed.

History
In the beginning of Optus Television, Optus had used sports rights as a key differentiator between it and rival Foxtel. They carried C7 Sport on their subscription television network until March 2002, when Optus replaced them with Fox Sports (Australia), rebranded as 'Optus Sports' until October of that year. In 2009 Optus Television ceased to be offered to new subscribers and the service was eventually ceased.

In July 2010, Malaysian backed Fetch TV launched in Australia, available through Optus. In 2015, new CEO Allen Lew, who had launched parent company Singtel's EPL coverage, laid out a three-year plan (2016–18) for Optus to transition from a Telecommunications provider to a multimedia company, as a 'content aggregator'.

Optus began trialling their own content delivery network in March 2015, and in November 2015 it was announced Optus had purchased the rights for the English Premier League in Australia until the conclusion of the 2018/19 season. In March 2016 it was announced the channels would be available through Fetch TV from Optus (rebranded as 'Yes TV'), as well as through a dedicated app and website, with satellite coverage available for those without appropriate internet speeds or for commercial venues. This announcement also included the fact that one match per round would be sub-licensed to a Free-to-Air channel. It was revealed by SBS that they had traded their FIFA World Cup licence for this sub-licence.

Optus announced pricing for the EPL coverage in May, which was revised after being poorly received by customers, with new pricing, including a period of 'free' coverage, announced in June.

Optus also announced they had done a deal with the Nine Network to share the International Champions Cup rights, with Optus showing all games played outside of Australia. Nine would share the China leg and retain exclusive rights to the Australian matches. This was the first live sport broadcast on the channels, with Manchester United playing Borussia Dortmund in Shanghai on 22 July 2016 as the first live event. Optus also added a friendly West Ham United pre-season match, and would later show their unsuccessful Europa League Qualifier against Astra Giurgiu.

Initial controversy
The news that Optus had secured the Premier League rights was not received well by existing supporters. Most were locked into plans with either Foxtel or other telecommunications providers, and were skeptical of how Australia's poor network infrastructure could handle 'live' broadcasts over IPTV. The first three rounds were mired with complaints on social media and in other media outlets.

Foxtel response
Incumbent rights holder Fox Sports (Australia) reacted quickly to the news they had lost the rights, removing the $15/month add-on BeIN Sports pack, and adding the channels to the existing Sports package. Club TV channels for Chelsea FC, Liverpool FC and Manchester United were also added, as were agreements to show Arsenal, Manchester City and Tottenham Hotspur games on delay.

Foxtel claimed Optus had threatened legal action over the new 'free' channels, and so added a 1 cent per channel per year charge to each.

Growth
Optus began to gradually add regional football competitions featuring Australian national teams, the 2016 FIFA Futsal World Cup and the 2016 AFF U-19 Youth Championship. They also screened the semi finals and final of the 2016 FIFA U-17 Women's World Cup.

In October 2016, Optus Sport 2 began broadcasting ads with the tagline: 'This summer is going to be big', announcing the launch of a 24/7 Cricket channel on the channel for November 1, 2016, running until 28 February 2017. This was an extension of the existing Optus agreement with Cricket Australia that saw all Optus customers eligible for a Cricket Australia Live Pass. The channel showed highlights and full match replays from ongoing matches, and original content such as '#Stumps', which had previously been available on the defunct Optus Cricket app. It also showed classic matches from the Cricket Australia archives.

Live content was available by linking the Optus Sport mobile app with the Cricket Australia App, but no live cricket content was available on the linear Optus Sport 2 channel.

Optus struggled to find further new sports to add to the service given that most major Australian sporting codes were signed to long-term broadcast contacts. They bid for exclusive rights to the A-League but balked at the added cost of technical and equipment fees. As of May 2017, CEO Allen Lew considered the rights acquisition and launch of Optus Sport a success, and hinted that further similar offerings may be added to the 'Yes TV' platform in the near future, although they would be 'non-sport related' and 'family oriented.' It was later revealed that Lew was discussing the launch of the National Geographic App.

2018 FIFA World Cup and relinquishing rights to SBS
Optus Sport purchased exclusive broadcast rights to broadcast 39 live matches of the 2018 FIFA World Cup in a deal with the public broadcaster SBS, who were awarded the original broadcast rights by FIFA. The remaining 25 matches would be simultaneously broadcast live on Optus Sport and SBS. The first game of the tournament that was broadcast exclusively on Optus Sport, Egypt vs. Uruguay on 15 June 2018, was marred with technical difficulties including buffering issues and failed connections. The negative reception and continued broadcasting problems resulted in a temporary arrangement made between Optus and SBS to broadcast all games on 18 and 19 June throughout a 48-hour period on SBS. This arrangement with SBS was extended on 20 June 2018 to include all group stage games, with Optus additionally leaving their app and streaming services free for the duration of the World Cup and until 31 August 2018 while refunding all current paid subscriptions. On 28 June 2018, Optus subsequently extended this arrangement to include all remaining matches at the World Cup.

Channels and content
Optus Sport operates eleven multiplex channels:
Optus Sport 1

Optus Sport 1 is the main channel, which predominantly shows Premier League however also shows UEFA Champions League, UEFA Europa League and internationals. It broadcasts the international feed produced by IMG. The 24/7 Premier League coverage was moved to Optus Sport 3 for the 2018 FIFA World Cup. It also shows Scores on Sunday, a 90 minute show dedicated to the week in football both domestically and internationally, male and female.

Optus Sport 2
Optus Sport 2 is the first overflow channel, and also shows selected international fixtures. During the 2018 FIFA World Cup, it was a secondary dedicated channel for the event, showing simultaneous live matches, replays, and highlights.

Optus Sport 3–6

Channels 3-6 are the remaining overflow channels and broadcast simultaneous live events of the Premier League or other competitions shown on Optus Sport.

On-air presenters
Cricket 2016–18

 Richard Bayliss (Host)
 Lisa Sthalekar (Host)
 Damien Fleming (Host)
 Jason Bennett (Host)
 Glenn McGrath (Analysis)
 Dean Jones (Analysis)
 Michael Hussey (Analysis)
 James Anderson (International Analysis)
 Jason Gillespie (Analysis)
 Ian Healy (Analysis)
 Chris Rogers (Analysis)
 John Emburey (International Analysis)
 Dirk Nannes (Analysis)
 Ryan Harris (Analysis)
 Simon Katich (Analysis)

FIFA Women's World Cup 2019

 Richard Bayliss (Host)
 Amy Duggan (Host)
 Mel McLaughlin (Host)
 Heather Garriock (Expert)
 Alicia Ferguson (Expert)
 Mark Schwarzer (Expert)
 John Aloisi (Expert)
 Catherine Cannuli (Expert)
 Ash Sykes (Expert)
 Georgia Yeoman-Dale (Expert)
 Amy Chapman (Expert)
 Tal Karp (Expert)
 Dean Heffernan (Expert)
 Ante Juric (Expert)
 Jules Breach (Reporter)
 Niav Owens (Reporter)
 Michelle Escobar (Reporter)

FIFA World Cup 2018

 Richard Bayliss (Host)
 Jules Breach (Host)
 Mel McLaughlin (Host)
 Mark Schwarzer (Analyst)
 Michael Bridges (Analyst)
 Tony Popovic (Expert)
 John Aloisi (Expert)
 Brett Emerton (Expert)
 Paul Okon (Expert)
 Shane Smeltz (Expert)
 Luke Wilkshire (Expert)
 Alex Wilkinson (Expert)
 Tony Vidmar (Expert)
 Amy Harrison (Expert)
 Sasa Ognenovski (Expert)
 Michael Zappone (Reporter)
 Kelly Somers (Reporter)

Copa America 2021

 Richard Bayliss (Host)
 Michelle Escobar (Reporter and Host)
 Thomas Sørensen (Host and Analyst)
 David Weiner (Host) 
 Michael Bridges (Analyst)
 John Aloisi (Expert)
 Scott McDonald (Expert)
 Craig Moore (Expert)
 Mark Schwarzer (Reporter and Analyst)

UEFA Euro 2020

 Richard Bayliss (Host)
 Jules Breach (Host)
 Paul Okon (Host)
 Michelle Escobar (Reporter and Host)
 Thomas Sørensen (Host and Analyst)
 Adriano Del Monte (Host) 
 David Weiner (Host) 
 Mel McLaughlin (Host)
 Michael Bridges (Analyst)
 John Aloisi (Expert)
 Kevin Muscat (Expert)
 Mark Milligan (Expert)
 Carl Robinson (Expert)
 Scott McDonald (Expert)
 Craig Moore (Expert)
 Mark Schwarzer (Reporter and Analyst)
 Michael Zappone (Reporter)
 Kelly Somers (Reporter)
 David Davutovic (Reporter) 
 Max Rushden (Reporter)
 Ollie Geale (Reporter)
 Max Merrill (Reporter)
 Alicia Ferguson (Reporter)

Tony Popovic, Brett Emerton, Paul Okon, Shane Smeltz, Luke Wilkshire, Alex Wilkinson, Tony Vidmar, Amy Harrison and Sasa Ognenovski.

Sports

Football

Club leagues and cups 
 Premier League (2016–2028): All matches and on demand
 La Liga (2022−): All matches and on demand
Women's Super League (2019–2024): All matches and on demand
 Premier League Asia Trophy (2019, 2021 and 2023)
 J-League (2020–2022): Four matches per week live and on demand
 DFB-Pokal (2022−2026): All matches and on demand
 DFB-Pokal Frauen (2022−2026): All matches and on demand
 Women's FA Cup (2019−2022): Finals only

International competitions

Copa América (2021 & 2024): All matches live and on demand
UEFA European Championship (2020 & 2024): All matches live and on demand
CONMEBOL–UEFA Cup of Champions (2022): Live and on demand
UEFA European Championship Qualifiers (2018–2024): All matches live and on demand
UEFA World Cup Qualifiers (2022−2026): All matches live and on demand
UEFA Nations League (2018–2023): All matches live and on demand
 Selected international friendlies played in Europe by UEFA teams (2018–2022): Live and on demand
UEFA Women's Euro 2022
FIFA Women's World Cup 2023: Host broadcaster, all matches live and on demand

Former sports
 FIFA Club World Cup (2019 & 2020)
 2018 FIFA World Cup
 2017 FIFA Confederations Cup
 2017 FIFA U-20 World Cup
 2017 FIFA Beach Soccer World Cup
 2016 FIFA Futsal World Cup
 2016 FIFA U-20 Women's World Cup
 2016 FIFA U-17 Women's World Cup
 2016 AFF Suzuki Cup
 2016 AFF U-19 Youth Championship
 International Champions Cup (2016)
Australian Cricket Team Tests, ODIs and Twenty20 matches. 
Big Bash League
Cricket Australia TV 
 Women's Big Bash League (2016/17)

See also

List of sports television channels
Internet television in Australia
List of Internet television providers

References

External links

Optus
Television channels and stations established in 2016
2016 establishments in Australia
English-language television stations in Australia
Sports television networks in Australia